Acheilognathus hypselonotus is a species of freshwater ray-finned fish in the genus Acheilognathus.  It is found in the lower regions of the Yangtze River in China.  Its maximum length is 16.5 cm. This species is once thought to be extinct, but was rediscovered in Dongting Lake in 2018.

References

Acheilognathus
Fish described in 1871
Freshwater fish of China